The 1970 Air Force Falcons football team represented the United States Air Force Academy as an independent during the 1970 NCAA University Division football season. Led by thirteenth-year head coach Ben Martin, the Falcons compiled a record of 9–3, outscored their opponents 366–239, and finished No. 16 in the AP Poll. They won their first eight games and were ranked seventh in the AP Poll for three weeks. Air Force played their home games at Falcon Stadium in Colorado Springs, Colorado.

This was the last season that Army was off of the Falcons' schedule; the Commander-in-Chief's Trophy was introduced two years later which matched the three academies annually. Previously, Air Force played Army in odd years and Navy 

Behind the passing of quarterback Bob Parker, the Falcons' notable wins were over No. 9 Missouri, and No. 6 Stanford, led by Heisman Trophy winner  Stanford went on to upset No. 2 Ohio State in the Rose Bowl.

Schedule

Personnel

References

Air Force
Air Force Falcons football seasons
Air Force Falcons football